Scolopsis ciliata, commonly known as saw-jawed monocle bream, is a fish native to the Indian and Pacific Oceans.

References

External links
 
 Bridled Monocle Bream @ Fishes of Australia

ciliata
Fish of Indonesia
Fauna of Queensland
Fish of the Indian Ocean
Fish described in 1802